Julián Alonso was the defending champion, but lost in the second round this year.

Francisco Clavet won the title, defeating Younes El Aynaoui 6–2, 6–4 in the final.

Seeds

  Marcelo Ríos (quarterfinals)
  Félix Mantilla (semifinals)
  Alberto Berasategui (second round)
  Gustavo Kuerten (second round)
  Francisco Clavet (champion)
  Mariano Puerta (quarterfinals, retired)
  Dominik Hrbatý (second round)
  Franco Squillari (second round)

Draw

Finals

Top half

Bottom half

External links
 Singles draw

Singles